Final standings of the 1945–46 Hungarian League season

Preliminary round

Eastern Group

Table

Results

Western Group

Table

Results

Final round

Play-off
1945–46 play-off competition of places 1–5 of both competitions (matches against teams in "own" class not played anymore, results of these matches copied from original competition).

Table

Results

Relegation round
1945–46 relegation competition of places 6–10 of both competitions (matches against teams in "own" class not played anymore, results of these matches copied from original competition).

Table

Results

Statistical leaders

Top goalscorers

External links
 IFFHS link

Nemzeti Bajnokság I seasons
Hun
1945–46 in Hungarian football